Coelocnemis dilaticollis, the California broad-necked darkling beetle, is a species of darkling beetle in the family Tenebrionidae. It is found mainly in the western United States and western Canada.

References

External links

 

Tenebrionidae
Beetles described in 1843